National Assembly elections were held in Nepal on 23 January 2020 across all seven provinces to elect the 18 of the 19 retiring members of the National Assembly. According to Article 86 of the Constitution of Nepal 2015, one third of the members of the National Assembly are elected every two years through an electoral college. Following the full implementation of the house in 2018, one-third of the members chosen by drawing a lottery retired after only two years.

Electoral college 
The electoral college consists of members of the provincial assembly and Chairperson/Mayor and Vice Chairperson/Deputy Mayor of the local bodies within the state. Each provincial assembly members vote has a weight of forty eight whereas each Chairperson/Mayor/Vice Chairperson/Deputy Mayor vote has a weight of eighteen. The electoral college elects 56 members to the National Assembly and three members, including one woman, are nominated by the president on the recommendation of the Government of Nepal.

Alliance

+

+

Results

Province No. 1

Province No. 2

Bagmati Pradesh

Gandaki Pradesh

Province No. 5

Karnali Pradesh

Sudurpaschim Pradesh

References

Elections in Nepal
2020 elections in Nepal
Nepal